The Greens of Andorra (VA) is a green political party in Andorra.

History
The party first contested national elections in 2005, when they ran in the parliamentary elections. They received 3.4% of the vote and failed to win a seat in the General Council. In the 2009 elections the party received 3.2% of the vote, failing to win a seat. The 2011 elections saw the party receive 3.4% of the vote, and again fail to win a seat.

References

External links
Official website 

2003 establishments in Andorra
Ecosocialist parties
European Green Party
Global Greens member parties
Green parties in Europe
Political parties established in 2003
Political parties in Andorra
Socialism in Andorra
Socialist parties in Europe